Román Quinos (born 23 July 1940) is an Argentine fencer. He competed in the individual and team sabre events at the 1968 Summer Olympics.

References

1940 births
Living people
Argentine male sabre fencers
Olympic fencers of Argentina
Fencers at the 1968 Summer Olympics
Fencers from Buenos Aires
Pan American Games medalists in fencing
Pan American Games silver medalists for Argentina
Pan American Games bronze medalists for Argentina
Fencers at the 1967 Pan American Games
Fencers at the 1971 Pan American Games
20th-century Argentine people